Bipasha Hayat (born 23 March 1971) is a Bangladeshi actress, model, painter and playback singer. She won Bangladesh National Film Award for Best Actress for her performance in the film Aguner Poroshmoni (1994). She earned Meril Prothom Alo Awards in 1998, 1999 and 2002.

Early life and education
Hayat completed her master's from the Faculty of Fine Arts, University of Dhaka in 1998.

Career
During the 90's Hayat played many popular television dramas. She wrote her first TV play "Shudhui Tomake Jani" in 1997.

She acted in two liberation war related movies Aguner Poroshmoni and Joyjatra. The first of those which was directed by Humayun Ahmed, she portrayed the role of a young girl who was blocked in her house with her family inside the city of Dhaka. Ratri as her characters name fell in love with a guerrilla freedom fighter (played by Asaduzzaman Noor) who lived in their house during the war for shelter. Her affection towards the fighter reflects the support and contribution of the civilians to the guerrilla fighters of the war. In Joyjatra, her character was much more different as she acted as a middle-aged mother who lost her son as she tried to escape from an army attack.

Painting

Hayat's art works were displayed at Miniature Painting Exhibition in Gallery Tone in Dhaka in 1996. In 1998, she took part in a group art exhibition at Divine Art Gallery in Pan Pacific Sonergaon Hotel. Later, she took part in Nine Contemporary Young Artists Exhibition at Zainul Gallery, FFA in 2002.

Hayat's 6th solo art exhibition titled "Mindscape" held during 14–24 January 2017 in Rome. It showcased 50 of her work, which included acrylics, drawings and cardboard acrylics.

Personal life
Hayat married Tauquir Ahmed, an actor and film director. She is the daughter of actor and director Abul Hayat. Her sister Natasha Hayat and brother-in-law Shahed Sharif Khan both have acting careers. Bipasha and Natasha invested on a boutique house in 2008. She has a daughter named Arisha Ahmed and a son named Aareeb Ahmed. The couple Bipasha Hayat and Touquir Ahmed is currently living in USA. and they likely to be settled in USA.

Works

Television dramas

Serial dramas

Films

Art

Art exhibitions 
 Spontaneity (2002)
 The Journey Within (2011)
 Realms of Memory (2015)
 Mindscape (2017)

Poster designs 
 Fagun Haway
 Haldaa

Music 
 Rupkothar Golpo (2006)

Awards
Bangladesh National Film Awards
 Best Actress - Aguner Poroshmoni (1994)
Meril Prothom Alo Awards
 Best TV Actress (Popular Choice) - 1998, 1999, 2000

References

External links
 

Living people
1971 births
20th-century Bangladeshi actresses
Bangladeshi female models
Bangladeshi film actresses
Bangladeshi television actresses
University of Dhaka Faculty of Fine Arts alumni
Best Actress National Film Awards (Bangladesh) winners
Place of birth missing (living people)
Best TV Actress Meril-Prothom Alo Award winners